Patrick O'Malley (1 July 1943 – 27 March 2021) was an Irish Progressive Democrats politician. He was elected to Dáil Éireann for the Dublin West constituency at the 1987 general election, along with 13 other Progressive Democrats Teachtaí Dála (TDs) to the 25th Dáil. He lost his seat at the 1989 general election. He was a cousin of the Progressive Democrats founder Desmond O'Malley.

He died on 27 March 2021.

See also
Families in the Oireachtas

References

1943 births
2021 deaths
Members of the 25th Dáil
Progressive Democrats TDs
Politicians from Limerick (city)